Pier Vittorio Tondelli (14 September 1955 – 16 December 1991) was an Italian writer who wrote a small but influential body of work.  He was born in Correggio, a small town in the  Emilia-Romagna region in Italy and died in nearby Reggio Emilia because of AIDS.  Tondelli enjoyed modest success as a writer but often encountered trouble with censors for his use of homosexual themes in his works. Tondelli was buried in a small cemetery in the hamlet of Canolo, just outside Correggio.



Biography
Tondelli developed an early interest in reading as an adolescent, reading what one might normally expect from a young adult male -- Treasure Island, Journey to the Center of the Earth, and various Westerns.  As Tondelli grew older, his reading tastes would develop and in 1974 he began to write his first narratives, saying: "I have always written, starting at 16 years of age with the usual story about adolescent frustrations".  These adolescent frustrations are conflicts between Tondelli's religiosity, his desire to express his artistry, and his homosexual desires as well as a change in Tondelli's belief system, in which he writes: "I find it vulgar to pray to God side by side with people for whom God is different from my God." Tondelli developed a jealousy towards God, who he describes as unique to himself, developing a mysticism all of his own but admitted to losing something as his belief system matured.

Tondelli took his high school exams in 1974 and then enrolled at the University of Bologna's DAMS (Discipline Arte Musica e Spettacolo) where he took courses with Umberto Eco and Gianni Celati, two of Italy's most celebrated writers and academics.  In 1979, he sent a manuscript to Aldo Tagliaferri.  Tondelli credits Tagliaferri with teaching and guiding him in his writing, reinforcing upon the young author the necessity of re-writing one's work.  A year later in January 1980, Altri Libertini was published, and, the following month, Tondelli graduated from the University of Bologna.

In April 1980, Tondelli was called up for military service, a requirement for Italian men at the time, stationed at Orvieto and then in Rome.  Tondelli's military service provided him with the necessary experience to write two works:  Il diario del soldato Acci and Pao Pao.

Works by Tondelli
Many of Tondelli's works have been published by Bompiani in a two-volume set. Volume 1 contains his novels and short stories, and Volume 2 contains more stories, essays, conversations and miscellaneous writings.   Volume 1 includes an introduction and chronology by Fulvio Panzeri: Opere. Milano: Bompiani, 2000. .  Volume 2 contains an extensive bibliography of Tondelli's writings and writings on/about Tondelli, his works, etc.  Many of his works can also be purchased individually as well.

Altri Libertini (1980)
Il Diario Del Soldato Acci (1981)
Rimini (1985)
Camere Separate (1989)
Pao Pao (1989)
Un weekend postmoderno. Cronache dagli anni ottanta (1990)
L'abbandono. Racconti degli anni Ottanta (1993)
Dinner Party (1994)
Biglietti Agli Amici (1997)
Racconti
La casa!...La casa!...
Desperados
Attraversamento dell'addio
Ragazzi a Natale
Pier a gennaio
Questa specie di patto
My sweet car
Un racconto sul vino
Sabato italiano

Criticism and interpretation
Although most of the criticism of Tondelli is in Italian, some well-researched monographs have been published in English.

In English
Baranski, Zygmunt G. and Lino Pertile. The New Italian Novel. Writers of Italy. Edinburgh: Edinburgh University Press, 1993.
Duncan, Derek. Reading and Writing Italian Homosexuality: A Case of Possible Difference. Aldershot, Hampshire, England: Ashgate, 2006.
Pallotta, Augustus. Italian Novelists Since World War II, 1965-1995. Dictionary of literary biography, v. 196. Detroit, Mich: Gale Research, 1998.

In Italian
Elena Buia. Verso casa : viaggio nella narrativa di Pier Vittorio Tondelli, 2000.
Viller Masoni, and Fulvio Panzeri. Studi per Tondelli: le tesi di laurea e i saggi critici del Premio Tondelli 2001. Parma: Monte Università Parma, 2002.
Elisabetta Mondello. In principio fu Tondelli: letteratura, merci, televisione nella narrativa degli anni Novanta. Cultura, 601. Milano: Il saggiatore, 2007.
Massimiliano Chiamenti. "Verba (cartacea) manent: varianti autografe in "Altri libertini" di Pier Vittorio Tondelli". Cambridge: The Italianist, 2007.
Enrico Palandri. Pier: Tondelli e la generazione. Contromano. Roma: Laterza, 2005.
Enos Rota. Caro Pier--: i lettori di Tondelli: ritratto di una generazione. Milano: Selene, 2002.
Sciltian Gastaldi. Tondelli: scrittore totale. Il racconto degli anni Ottanta fra impegno, camp e controcultura gay. Roma: Pendragon, 2021.

Footnotes

External links
Tondelli, Pier Vittorio (1955-1991) biography
Centro di Documentazione Pier Vittorio Tondelli
Chronology of the Life of Tondelli
Antonio Spadaro's Site on Tondelli
A collage exhibition by Angela Caporaso - A tribute to Pier Vittorio Tondelli

1955 births
1991 deaths
People from Correggio, Emilia-Romagna
AIDS-related deaths in Italy
20th-century Italian novelists
20th-century Italian male writers
Italian male novelists
Gay novelists
Italian LGBT novelists
Italian gay writers
Infectious disease deaths in Emilia-Romagna
20th-century Italian LGBT people